Feyrouz is an Arabic given name for females and males. Variants of the name include Fayrouz , Fyrooz and Fairuz.

Notable people with the name include:
Fayrouz Aboelkheir (born 2006), Egyptian squash player
Fayrouz Saad, American politician

Feyrouz may also refer to:

Fairuz (born 1935), Lebanese singer spouse of Assi Rahbani
Fayrouz Al Halabiya (Rachel Samocha), Jewish-Syrian singer
Feyrouz (actress) (1943–2016), Egyptian actress of Armenian origin

Arabic feminine given names